The women's barebow archery individual competition at the 2017 World Games took place from 26 to 28 July 2017 at the Szczytnicki Park in Wrocław, Poland.

Competition format
A total of 12 archers entered the competition. After ranking round athletes who come first and second qualifies directly to semifinals. The rest of competitors is divided into two groups, where they compete against each other in the stepladder competition format. The winners of the two groups advances to the semifinals. In group matches athletes shoot 18 arrows, in semifinals and finals - 12 arrows.

Results

Ranking round

Competition bracket

Group A

Group B

Finals

References 

Women's individual barebow
World Games